Women's 10 metre air rifle was one of the fifteen shooting events at the 1996 Summer Olympics. Renata Mauer narrowly defeated Petra Horneber to win her first Olympic gold medal, as well as the first gold medal of the Atlanta games. Aleksandra Ivošev won the bronze medal; all three medalists finished within 0.4 points of each other.

Qualification round

OR Olympic record – Q Qualified for final

Final

References

Sources

Shooting at the 1996 Summer Olympics
Olymp
Women's events at the 1996 Summer Olympics